Nelsons may refer to:

Andris Nelsons (born 1978), classical music conductor
Nelsons (homeopathy), an international company based in London

See also 
All pages starting with "Nelsons"
All pages starting with "Nelson's"